Kosmos 28 ( meaning Cosmos 28) or Zenit-2 No.16 was a Soviet, a first generation, low resolution, optical film-return reconnaissance satellite which was launched in 1964.

A Vostok-2 rocket, s/n G15001-04, was used to launch Kosmos 28. The launch took place at 09:36 GMT on 4 April 1964 from Site 31/6 at the Baikonur Cosmodrome. Following its successful arrival in orbit the spacecraft received its Kosmos designation, along with the International Designator 1964-017A and the Satellite Catalog Number 00779.

Kosmos 28 was operated in a low Earth orbit. On 12 April 1964, the spacecraft was deorbited, with its return capsule descending by parachute for recovery by Soviet forces.

References

Spacecraft launched in 1964
Kosmos satellites
Spacecraft which reentered in 1964
Zenit-2 satellites